The Cleveland Botanical Garden, located in the University Circle neighborhood of Cleveland, Ohio, in the United States.

History
The garden was founded in 1930 as the Garden Center of Greater Cleveland. It was the first such organization in an American city. Originally housed in a converted boathouse on Wade Park Lagoon, the center served as a horticultural library, offering classes and workshops for gardeners and spearheading beautification projects in the community. In 1966, having outgrown its original home, the Garden Center moved to its present location in University Circle, the site of the old Cleveland Zoo. Remnants of the old bear pit still remain in the Ohio Woodland Garden. In 1994, the organization's Board of Trustees changed the name to Cleveland Botanical Garden to reflect a dramatically expanded mission and launched an ambitious capital campaign to develop a facility that would support the enhanced program agenda. The expanded and renovated building, designed by Graham Gund Architects of Cambridge, Massachusetts, opened to the public in July 2003.

Facilities

The centerpiece of the $50 million 2003 expansion is The Eleanor Armstrong Smith Glasshouse, a 17,000 square foot (1,700 m²) conservatory home to plant and animal life from two separate biomes, the spiny desert of Madagascar and the cloud forest of Costa Rica. They feature over  350 species of plants and 50 species of animals, including hundreds of butterflies.

There are also  of gardens, including the award-winning Hershey Children's Garden (the first children's garden in Ohio), the Elizabeth and Nona Evans Restorative Garden, the David and Paula Swetland Topiary Garden, the Western Reserve Herb Society Garden, the Japanese Garden, the Sears-Swetland Rose Garden, the Ohio Woodland, the C.K. "Pat" Patrick Perennial Border, and the public Campsey-Stauffer Gateway Garden.

Awards
The Vail Medal is awarded for "significant national contributions to the field of horticulture" Past winners include Lynden B. Miller

In popular culture
The gardens were featured in a fifth-season episode of Supernatural, titled "Dark Side of the Moon".

See also 
 List of botanical gardens in the United States

References

External links

 Cleveland Botanical Garden
 Cleveland Botanical Gardens 3D Model

Culture of Cleveland
Botanical gardens in Ohio
University Circle
Tourist attractions in Cleveland
Greenhouses in Ohio
Parks in Cleveland